The National Day Against Homophobia is a Canadian event organized by the Fondation Émergence.

June 1, 2005, marked the event's third anniversary, which was celebrated with a posthumous award to the late Prime Minister Pierre Trudeau, who as Minister of Justice introduced legislation which repealed anti-gay clauses from the Criminal Code.  Trudeau is also famous for saying that "The state has no business in the bedrooms of the nation" (a sentence taken from an editorial in The Globe and Mail).

In 2006, Fondation Émergence changed the day of observance to May 17, to join the International Day Against Homophobia movement (IDAHO).

See also

 Homophobia
 International Day Against Homophobia
 Heterosexism

References

External links
 Fondation Émergence

LGBT events in Canada
May observances
Anti-homophobia